Two Sticks and Six Strings is the second EP by Apologies, I Have None. It was released on CD in 2010 by the band without any label backing. The EP was also released on iTunes on 18 March 2009.

Track listing

Personnel
 Dan Bond
 Josh McKenzie

Additional personnel
 Gaby De Sena
 Ema Smith
 PJ Shepherd
 James Allan
 Tommy Simpson

Artwork
 Emma Smith

References

2009 EPs
Apologies, I Have None albums